Ñawicha (Quechua  ñawi eye, -cha a suffix, "little eye", also spelled Ñahuicha) is a mountain in the Arequipa Region in the Andes of Peru, about  high. It is situated in the Condesuyos Province, Chuquibamba District, southwest of the Coropuna volcano and the mountain Minasniyuq (Quechua for "the one with a mine", also spelled Minasnioc).

References 

Mountains of Peru
Mountains of Arequipa Region